Alliance Cinemas  (previously Alliance Atlantis Cinemas and Alliance Atlantis Beaches Cinemas, also known as Alliance Beach Cinemas) was a theatre chain, which operated 6 theatres at its peak. It is now owned by Cineplex Entertainment.

History
In July 2005, following Cineplex's acquisition of main rival Famous Players Theatres, the group was put up for sale. In 2005, the Fifth Avenue Cinemas and Park Theatre Cinemas locations in Vancouver were sold to Festival Cinemas, which has since been sold to Cineplex Entertainment on March 1, 2013. Around 2006, the University 4 Cinemas location in Victoria was sold to Empire Theatres, which was later sold to Landmark Cinemas on October 31, 2013. Landmark Cinemas currently operates the theatre. In 2007, The Bayview Village Cinemas location in Toronto shut down, potentially due to a failure to reach a lease agreement. The Cumberland 4 Cinemas location in Yorkville, Toronto was shutdown in May 2012. This left the company with only the Beaches Cinemas location left.

On January 1, 2019, Alliance Cinemas officially "joined" the Cineplex brand of movie theatres and now requires patrons to purchase tickets on cineplex.com or in the theatre. The theatre now allows patrons to utilize the Scene loyalty program. The Beach location was the last to rebrand, January 1, 2021.

References

External links 
 http://alliancecinemas.com - Official site
 https://www.cineplex.com/Theatre/cineplex-cinemas-beaches - Theatre page on cineplex.com
 http://allianceatlantiscinemas.com - allianceatlantiscinemas.com on the Wayback Machine

Cineplex Entertainment
Movie theatre chains in Canada
Former cinemas in Canada
Entertainment companies established in 1998